The Icelandic Encyclopedia A-Ö is an encyclopedia in the Icelandic language published in 1990 by Örn og Örlygur. The book is in three volumes, containing about 37,000 tags and 4,500 drawings and maps, and is also the first Icelandic encyclopedia. The editors were Dóra Hafsteinsdóttir and Sigríður Harðardóttir. Another printing came out in 1992.

The book is based on the Danish Fakta, Gyldendals etbinds leksikon issued in 1988. Contracts on the encyclopedia were reached in 1987 and originally planned to come out in a parallel Danish edition.

References

External links 
 http://timarit.is/view_page_init.jsp?pageId=2694698

Icelandic non-fiction literature
1990 non-fiction books
Icelandic encyclopedias
20th-century encyclopedias